Walter Richli (28 April 1913 – 1944) was a Swiss cyclist. He competed in the team pursuit event at the 1936 Summer Olympics.

References

External links
 

1913 births
1944 deaths
Swiss male cyclists
Olympic cyclists of Switzerland
Cyclists at the 1936 Summer Olympics
Cyclists from Zürich